Albert Elijah Dunning (January 5, 1844 – November 14, 1923) was an American Congregationalist theologian.

Biography
He was born in Brookfield, Connecticut and attended the Fort Edward Institute (1860–1861). He graduated from Bryant & Stratton College (1862) and Yale University (1867), where he was Phi Beta Kappa and a member of Skull and Bones. Additionally, he graduated from Andover Theological Seminary (1870), and Beloit College (1889) with a DD.  He was pastor of the Highland Congregational Church in Roxbury, Boston (1870–1881). He was editor of The Congregationalist  (1889–1911) and Pilgrim Teacher (1873–1877). He was author of Bible Studies (1886); Congregationalists in America (1894); and The Making of the Bible (1911).

He married Harriet W. Beekman on December 27, 1870.

He died at his home in Brookline, Massachusetts on November 14, 1923, and was buried at Walnut Hills Cemetery.

References

 "Albert Elijah Dunning." Dictionary of American Biography. New York: Charles Scribner's Sons, 1936. Gale Biography In Context. Web. March 30, 2011.

1844 births
1923 deaths
American theologians
Yale University alumni
Andover Newton Theological School alumni
Beloit College alumni
American male writers
American editors
Bryant and Stratton College alumni